The Anti-Rightist Campaign in the People's Republic of China, which lasted from 1957 to roughly 1959, was a political campaign to purge alleged "Rightists" within the Chinese Communist Party (CCP) and the country as a whole. The campaign was launched by Chairman Mao Zedong, but Deng Xiaoping and Peng Zhen also played an important role. The Anti-Rightist Campaign significantly damaged democracy in China and turned the country into a de facto one-party state.

The definition of rightists was not always consistent, often including critics to the left of the government, but officially referred to those intellectuals who appeared to favor capitalism, or were against one-party rule as well as forcible, state-run collectivization. According to China's official statistics published during the "Boluan Fanzheng" period, the campaign resulted in the political persecution of at least 550,000 people. Some researchers believe that the actual number of persecuted is between 1 and 2 million or even higher. Deng Xiaoping admitted that there were mistakes during the Anti-Rightist Campaign, and most victims have received rehabilitation since 1959.

History

Background
The Anti-Rightist Campaign was a reaction against the Hundred Flowers Campaign which had promoted pluralism of expression and criticism of the government, even though initiation of both campaigns was controlled by Mao Zedong and were integrally connected. Going perhaps as far back as the Long March there had been resentment against "rightists" inside the CCP, for example, Zhang Bojun.

While the Hundred Flowers Movement was going on, in 1956, Khrushchev published the On the Cult of Personality and Its Consequences, among the ensuing riots in Poland and Hungary, had a large impact on China, where similar social unrest began to take place.

First wave
The first wave of attacks began immediately as the Hundred Flowers Campaign drew to a close in June 1957. At the time, Mao began to view criticism during the Hundred Flowers as a threat to the rule of the party. In mid-May, Mao began writing Things Are Beginning to Change, an article that was not completed until June 11. In the article he said, "why is such a torrent of reactionary, vicious statements being allowed to appear in the press? to let the people have some idea of these poisonous weeds and noxious fumes so as to have them uprooted or dispelled."  On June 8, 1957, Mao drafted an inner-party document, Muster Our Forces to Repulse the Rightists' Wild Attacks, saying that "some bad capitalists, bad intellectuals, and reactionary elements in society are mounting wild attacks against the working class and the Communist Party in an attempt to overthrow the state power lead by the working class." On the same day, People's Daily published an editorial What is this for?, expressing the same view as the inner-pary document. These marked the beginning of the Anti-Rightist Campaign. By the end of the year, 300,000 people had been labeled as rightists, including the writer Ding Ling. Future premier Zhu Rongji, then working in the State Planning Commission, was purged in 1958. Most of the accused were intellectuals. The penalties included informal criticism, hard labor, and in some cases, execution. For example, Jiabiangou, a notable labor camp in Gansu, held approximately 3,000 political prisoners from 1957 to 1961, of whom about 2,500 died, mostly of starvation. 

One main target was the independent legal system. Legal professionals were transferred to other jobs; judicial power was exercised instead by political cadres and the police.

Second wave
The second part of the campaign followed the Lushan Conference of July 2 – August 16, 1959, a meeting of top party leaders. The meeting condemned the PRC's defense minister, General Peng Dehuai, a critic of the Great Leap Forward.

Criticism by Mao 
Administering several provinces in the southwest, Deng proved so zealous in liquidating alleged counter-revolutionaries that even the Chairman felt obliged to write to him. Mao urged Deng Xiaoping to slow down the campaign's body count, saying:

Rehabilitation
After Mao's death in 1976, many of the convictions were revoked during the Boluan Fanzheng period. At that time, under leader Deng Xiaoping, the government announced that it needed capitalists' experience to get the country moving economically, and subsequently the guilty verdicts of thousands of counterrevolutionary cases were overturned — affecting many of those accused of rightism and who had been persecuted for that crime the previous twenty two years. This came despite the fact that Deng Xiaoping and Peng Zhen were among the most enthusiastic prosecutors of the movement during the "First Wave" of 1957.

Censorship in China
In 2009, leading up the 60th anniversary of the PRC's founding, a number of media outlets in China listed the most significant events of 1957 but downplayed or omitted reference to the Anti-Rightist Movement. Websites were reportedly notified by authorities that the topic of the movement was extremely sensitive.

Famous Rightists
Zhang Bojun, China's "number one rightist"
Luo Longji, China's "number two rightist"
Huang Qixiang
Chen Mingshu
Chen Mengjia
Zhu Rongji, later Premier of China
Wu Zuguang, playwright
Qian Weichang
Gu Zhun
Long Yun, former warlord of Yunnan

See also
Great Leap Forward
Cultural Revolution
De-Stalinization
List of CCP Campaigns
Sufan movement
Yan'an Rectification Movement

References

External links
An Overview of Democracy Movements in China
Petitioning for redress over the anti-rightist campaign – Human Rights in China (HRIC), 2005

 
Campaigns of the Chinese Communist Party
Political repression in China
Political and cultural purges
Maoist terminology
Maoist China
Cold War history of China
Communist repression
1950s in China
Human rights abuses in China
Persecution of intellectuals